Rosalinda is a 2009 Philippine television drama romance series broadcast by GMA Network. The series is based on a 1999 Mexican television series of the same title. Directed by Maryo J. de los Reyes and Gil Tejada Jr., it stars Carla Abellana in the title role and Geoff Eigenmann. It premiered on July 6, 2009, on the network's Telebabad line up replacing Totoy Bato. The series concluded on November 27, 2009, with a total of 105 episodes. It was replaced by Full House in its timeslot.

Background
Rosalinda is a Mexican telenovela that was aired in 1999 on Televisa with singer-actress Thalía in the title role and Fernando Carrillo as Fernando Jose. The series had 80 forty-five-minute episodes, It was originally created by Delia Fiallo.

The Mexican series was aired in the Philippines in 2000, dubbing in Tagalog language. After airing its first episode, its ratings began to rise and Rosalinda became the most popular telenovela in the Philippines after Marimar. Re-runs of Rosalinda were aired on GMA Network in 2008 to 2009.

Premise
The series starts with a woman named Soledado. Attorney Alfredo Del Castillo is Soledad's boss and secret lover. Jose Fernando Atlamirano, Alfredo's brother-in-law, feels lust for Soledad, but she only has eyes for Alfredo. One day, Jose Fernando sends a letter to Soledad pretending to be Alfredo. When she arrives at their meeting place, Jose Fernando tries to rape Soledad. Alfredo arrives just in time and kills Jose Fernando to save Soledad. However, Alfredo collapses from a seizure, and Soledad is left holding the gun as the help and a young Fernando Jose, Jose Fernando's son, arrives on the scene. Jose Fernando's wife and Alfredo's sister, Dona Valeria, does not believe that it was Alfredo who killed her husband, but blames Soledad. As such, Soledad is sent to prison for 24 years for a crime she did not commit.

While serving her sentence, Soledad gives birth to a baby girl, naming her Rosalinda. But because she is incarcerated, she is forced to give the baby to her sister, Dolores Perez . At the same time, Dolores' daughter dies. To avoid telling her husband, Javier, the truth, she tells him that Rosalinda is their daughter. When Soledad finds out, she gets angry, but she also realizes that her daughter will have a better future not knowing that her real mother is in jail.

Years later, Rosalinda is now an adult and falls in love with the handsome Fernando Jose. Neither knows the truth about their respective pasts. When Dona Valeria finds out that Fernando Jose is in a relationship, she gets mad at her son for dating someone beneath their social status. Dolores and Rosalinda's sister, Fedra also does not accept their relationship because she is also infatuated with Fernando Jose. But despite all the things and people going against them, Rosalinda and Fernando Jose find a way to keep their love strong.

Cast and characters

Lead cast
 Carla Abellana as Rosalinda Perez-Altamirano / Rosalinda Del Castillo-Altamirano / Paloma Dorantes
 Geoff Eigenmann as Fernando Jose Salvador Altamirano

Supporting cast
 Katrina Halili as Fedra Perez
 Jomari Yllana as Alessandro Durantes
 Sheryl Cruz as Valeria del Castillo-Altamirano
 Jackie Lou Blanco as Veronica Salvador Altamirano
 Ariel Rivera as Alfredo Del Castillo
 Glydel Mercado as Soledad Romero
 Jessa Zaragosa as Evangelina Kintanar-del Castillo
 Ryza Cenon as Abril Del Castillo
 Gary Estrada as Javier Perez
 Mart Escudero as Beto Perez
 Krystal Reyes as Lucy Perez
 Gian Magdangal as Gerardo De Navarette
 Roderick Paulate as Florencio 
 Sheena Halili as Becky
 Mike Tan as Rico
 Marco Alcaraz as Anibal
 Carlene Aguilar as Rodora
 Yul Servo as Roberto 
 Sherilyn Reyes as Dulce
 Marky Lopez as Julio
 Ayen Munji-Laurel as Berta Alvarez / Delia
 Sheree Bautista as Natalia

Guest cast
 Carlos Morales as Jose Fernando Altamirano
 Jennifer Sevilla as Dolores Romero Perez
 Mymy Davao as Clarita
 Isabel Oli as Austerica Carvajal
 Bernard Palanca as Allan
 Ana Capri as a client of a mental hospital
 Charlie Davao as Victor Durantes
 Bebs Hollmann as Pamela
 Chelsea Eugenio as young Rosalinda
 Francheska Salcedo as young Fedra

Ratings
According to AGB Nielsen Philippines' Mega Manila household television ratings, the pilot episode of Rosalinda earned a 26.3% rating. While the final episode scored a 27% rating.

Accolades

References

External links
 

2009 Philippine television series debuts
2009 Philippine television series endings
Filipino-language television shows
GMA Network drama series
Philippine romance television series
Philippine television series based on Mexican television series
Philippine television series based on telenovelas
Television shows set in the Philippines